Euclystis is a genus of moths in the family Erebidae.

Species
 Euclystis angularis (Moschler, 1886)
 Euclystis antecedens (Walker, 1858)
 Euclystis cayuga Schaus, 1921
 Euclystis centurialis Hubner, 1823
 Euclystis deterrimus (Schaus, 1911)
 Euclystis diascia Hampson, 1926
 Euclystis epidromiaelineatus Feige, 1972
 Euclystis epulea (Herrich-Schaffer, 1858)
 Euclystis facunda (Felder & Rogenhofer, 1874)
 Euclystis fulica (Felder & Rogenhofer, 1874)
 Euclystis furvus (Schaus, 1912)
 Euclystis fuscicilia Hampson, 1926
 Euclystis ghilianii (Guenee, 1852)
 Euclystis golosus (Dognin, 1897)
 Euclystis gorge (Schaus, 1912)
 Euclystis gravidus (Schaus, 1914)
 Euclystis gregalis (Schaus, 1912)
 Euclystis guerini (Guenee, 1852)
 Euclystis infusella Walker
 Euclystis insanus (Guenee, 1852) (or Euclystis insana)
 Euclystis intactus (Felder & Rogenhofer, 1874)
 Euclystis invidiosus (Schaus, 1911)
 Euclystis isoa (Guenee, 1852)
 Euclystis labecia (Druce, 1890)
 Euclystis lacaena (Druce, 1890)
 Euclystis lala (Druce, 1890)
 Euclystis laluma (Schaus, 1915)
 Euclystis manto (Cramer, 1776)
 Euclystis masgaba (Schaus, 1914)
 Euclystis maximus (Druce, 1890)
 Euclystis mnyra Schaus, 1921
 Euclystis myodes Felder & Rogenhofer, 1874
 Euclystis nescia (Schaus, 1911)
 Euclystis onusta (Schaus, 1911)
 Euclystis pallidipes (Schaus, 1911)
 Euclystis perplexus (Schaus, 1911)
 Euclystis plusioides (Walker, 1858)
 Euclystis polioperas Hampson, 1926
 Euclystis polyoperas Schaus, 1921
 Euclystis postponens (Walker, 1858)
 Euclystis proba (Schaus, 1911)
 Euclystis recurvus (Walker, 1858)
 Euclystis steniellus Hampson
 Euclystis sublignaris Schaus, 1911
 Euclystis subtremula Schaus, 1921
 Euclystis sytis (Guenee, 1852)
 Euclystis terraba (Schaus, 1911)

References
 Euclystis  at Markku Savela's Lepidoptera and Some Other Life Forms
 
 Natural History Museum Lepidoptera genus database

External links

Omopterini
Noctuoidea genera